SF2 may refer to:

 SF zwei (Schweizer Fernsehen zwei), a Swiss television channel broadcasting in German
 Fahlin SF-2 Plymocoupe an experimental aircraft built by Ole Fahlin
 SoundFont 2, a file format for audio samples and associated data for use in musical synthesis
 ASF/SF2, a protein
 Sulfur difluoride, a chemical compound
 A kind of glass fabricated by Schott.
 SF2 (Scuba Force 2), an ECCR

Video games
 SaGa Frontier 2
 Secret Files 2: Puritas Cordis
 Shadow Fight 2
 Shining Force II
 Star Fox 2
 Street Fighter II
 Syphon Filter 2